Australian toll roads are found in the eastern states of New South Wales, Victoria and Queensland. Most of the toll roads are within the urban limits of Sydney, Melbourne and Brisbane, with the exception of the Toowoomba Bypass in Toowoomba, Queensland.

Most of the toll roads are partially owned or operated by Transurban. All toll roads in Australia are tolled electronically (cashless) using free-flow tolling. All toll collection points are toll gantries, with the last cash toll booths in the country closed in July 2013 on the M5 South West Motorway.

Tolls are collected from an e-TAG transponder attached to the vehicle's windscreen. The first e-TAG was developed in the 1990s by Transurban who owns and operates the CityLink in Melbourne in preparation for what would be one of the world's first 'fully electronic' tollways. There are different e-TAG retailers across the country, such as Transurban's Linkt or Transport for NSW's e-Toll.

According to Professor Mark Hickman, the chair of Transport at the University of Queensland's School of Civil Engineering, toll roads in Australia have not reached expected traffic volumes and do not always relieve congestion in the short-term. Melbourne's CityLink tollway (M1 and M2 sections) carry the highest volume of traffic and also generate the highest revenue of all the tollways (by a substantial amount). This is mainly due to the necessary cross-city and North (Melbourne Airport-bound) corridors.

Current toll roads

Former toll roads

Future toll roads
 West Gate Tunnel in Melbourne, to connect the West Gate Freeway at Yarraville with the Port of Melbourne and CityLink at Docklands, under construction and anticipated to open in 2025.
M6 Motorway in Sydney, to connect the M8 Motorway at Arncliffe with President Avenue, Kogarah, anticipated to open in 2025.
Western Harbour Tunnel & Beaches Link in Sydney, to connect the M4-M5 Link, Victoria Road and the Anzac Bridge at Rozelle, with the Burnt Bridge Creek Deviation at Balgowlah, under planning and anticipated to open in 2026.
 North East Link in Melbourne, to connect the M80 Ring Road at Greensborough with the M3 Eastern Freeway at Bulleen, under planning and anticipated to open in 2027.

Toll concessions and prices

New South Wales

Distance-based tolling

Fixed or time of day tolling

Queensland

Victoria

See also

Freeways in Australia
Road transport in Australia

References

 
Highways in Australia